Hellinsia obandoi is a moth of the family Pterophoridae that is endemic to Costa Rica.

Adults are on wing in August.

References

obandoi
Moths described in 1999
Moths of the Caribbean
Endemic fauna of Costa Rica